The Computing Research Association's Committee on Widening Participation in Computing Research (CRA-WP) has the mission of increasing the success and participation of underrepresented groups in computing research and education at all levels. In particular, CRA-WP focuses on computer science and engineering and tries to make sure their activities have a positive impact on underrepresented groups in these areas. CRA-WP is also concerned with improving the success rate of all computer scientists and engineers in the working environment. Formerly known as the
Committee on the Status of Women in Computing Research (CRA-W), the committee changed its name and acronym in 2019.

Awards
 2005: CRA-W was awarded the National Science Board's Public Service Award for its action-oriented programs aimed at increasing the number and success of women participating in computer science and engineering research and education.
 2004: CRA-W co-founders Maria Klawe and Nancy Leveson were awarded CRA's A. Nico Habermann Award recognizing their role as founding co-chairs of the highly successful CRA-W Committee.
 2003: CRA-W was awarded a Presidential Award for Excellence in Science, Mathematics, and Engineering Mentoring for long-running work to address the underrepresentation of women in computer science and engineering.

References

External links
 Official CRA-WP website
 CRA webpage

Computer science organizations